In February 2022, four Canadian men were arrested on allegations that they conspired to kill Royal Canadian Mounted Police (RCMP) officers. The arrests occurred during the Canada convoy protest on the Coutts, Alberta, side of the Sweetgrass–Coutts Border Crossing. According to police, the plot was part of a wider plan to alter "Canada's political, justice and medical systems."

Background 

In January 2022, people protested in Coutts about their objections to public health measures implemented by Canadian governments in response to the COVID-19 pandemic. The protest was the start of a convoy of protestors that later proceeded to Ottawa. The protest blocked the border crossing to the United States. After hearing reports that protestors were planning to bring firearms to the protest and prepare for "war", police deployed undercover officers. Police also used telephone wiretaps to listen to mobile phones. Due to the perceived emergency, no prior judicial authorisation was obtained for the wiretaps, as is permitted by the Criminal Code of Canada.

According to police, on February 10, protestor Anthony Olienick informed two undercover female police officers that he was expecting a delivery, which the officers understood to be a bag of firearms. Police officers stated that they observed Olienick, Chris Carbert, and Jerry Morin receiving a package.

Arrests 
A search warrant was executed by police just after midnight on February 14, 2022. Three trailers located in Coutts were searched by police who found fifteen firearms, ammunition, and body-armour with a Diagolon patch. Police found a handgun in Lysak's residential trailer and a rifle with a scope and rangefinder in Lysak's vehicle near Coutts. Another search of property owned by Anthony Olienick in rural Alberta discovered 36,098 rounds of ammunition, two pipe bombs, and several firearms.

Anthony Olienick, Chris Carbert, Christopher Lysak, and Jerry Morin were arrested and charged with conspiracy to murder. Olienick was also charged with making or possessing an explosive device.

Police ended the protest on February 15, 2022, after the arrests. Protestors cooperated with police, stating that they rejected the violence and firearms associated with the arrested men.

Accused

Anthony Olienick 
Anthony Olienick, also known as Tony Olienick, is the owner-operator of Claresholm trucking company. He was aged 40 in November 2022 and prior to his arrest, he lived in Claresholm.

According to Royal Canadian Mounted Police, Olienick was providing security for protest, including providing video surveillance of police positions. Police believe that Olienick was plotting to kill police officers. On February 14, 2022, police discovered 36,098 rounds of ammunition, firearms, and two pipe-bombs on Olienick's property. Two Diagolon patches were also discovered during the search of his Coutts property that included a mobile home and two trailers. During police interviews, Anthony Olienick shared predictions that the Government of Canada sought to destroy the middle class, install a communist regime before the start of executions and use of gas chambers. Olienick, has been charged with conspiracy to commit murder. and with making or possessing an explosive device. He is being held in Lethbridge Correctional Centre

Chris Lysak 
Lysak is accused of plotting to kill police officers. On February 14, 2022, he was arrested and charged with conspiracy to murder, possession of a weapon, and mischief. During his police interviews, Lysak stated that he believed that the COVID-19 vaccinations presented deadly risks to children. He was denied bail in March 2022 and his request to skip the pretrial stage of the judicial process in April 2022 was also denied.

He was aged 48 in October 2022. Prior to his arrest, Lysak lived in Lethbridge, Alberta. Lysak is connected to the far-right protest group Diagolon and flew the group's flag outside his home. He is also connected to the group's leader, Jeremy MacKenzie.

Chris Carbert 
Carbert is accused of plotting to kill police officers. In February 2022, he was charged with conspiracy to murder, possession of a weapon, and mischief. During police interviews, Carbert expressed a desire to encourage Prime Minister Justin Trudeau and Alberta Premier Jason Kenney to resign. Carbert will be tried together with the three other co-accused, skipping the preliminary inquiry stage and proceeding directly to the Court of King's Bench of Alberta. Carbert is represented by lawyer Balfour Der.

Carbert also has links to Jeremy MacKenzie, of Diagolon. He posted a video to his Facebook page in which he repeated statements that he was ready to die while protesting government imposed public health measures. He was aged 45 in May 2022. Prior to his arrest, Carbert lived in Lethbridge, Alberta. Carbert has previous criminal convictions for assault, narcotics trafficking, and driving a vehicle while under the influence of alcohol.

Jerry Morin 
Jerry Mitchell Morin is accused of plotting to kill police officers. He was arrested on February 14, 2022 while driving on Alberta Highway 2 near Coutts. He charged with conspiracy to murder, possession of a weapon for dangerous purpose, and mischief. Morin allegedly had two guns on him when he was arrested. During police interviews, Morin spoke of his perception that they were in World War III and that people were being made into slaves. The day prior to his arrest, Morin made a Facebook post describing the protest in Coutts as a war: "Come on down tonight, there's no excuses, this is war".

Morin will be tried together with the three other co-accused, skipping the preliminary inquiry stage and proceeding directly to the Court of King's Bench of Alberta. Morin was aged 40 in July 2022. Prior to his arrest he lived in Olds, Alberta.

Legal proceedings 
In court, police constable Trevor Checkley stated that, during the protest, Chris Carbert "received a text message...and was told to share a message with non-mainstream media and on social media." Checkley also told Lethbridge provincial court that "The message and a related followup text...stated the protest was not just about ending vaccine and public health mandates but altering Canada's political, justice and medical systems, including the elimination of a group of people referred to as the professional political class," and that someone whose name was redacted "also shared the above message...in a group text chat with Carbert, Lysak and Olienick.”

Court documents released in December 2022 indicated that police believe the four accused were being directed by remote leadership.

All four accused have been denied bail, and their criminal trial is scheduled for June 2023.

Public reaction 
A convoy of 235 vehicles drove from Lethbridge to the Coutts border crossing on January 30, 2023 as part of a wider campaign of support for the four accused.

References 

2022 crimes in Canada
2022 in Alberta
Canada convoy protest
Crimes against police officers in Canada
Failed assassination attempts
February 2022 crimes in North America